Bongani Thomas Bongo (born 29 June 1978) is a South African politician, whose ANC membership is currently suspended along with the party's secretary-general Ace Magashule. Bongo is the former Minister of State Security, a position to which he was appointed on 17 October 2017 by President Jacob Zuma until he was relieved from the post on 28 February 2018. He was the only appointment that had not been a cabinet minister before. He is also the elected  President of the University of Limpopo's Alumni and Convocation Association. As the Minister of State Security, Bongo headed the State Security Agency of South Africa.

A lawyer and ANC politician from Mpumalanga, Bongo has been a member of Parliament since the May 2014 national elections, taking up roles in various portfolio committees, including the Constitutional Review Committee that was investigating the feasibility of changing Section 25 of the South African Constitution, the ad hoc committee on the amendment of Section 25 as well as the ad hoc committee that appointed Busisiwe Mkhwebane as Public Protector.

On 2 July 2019, Bongo was elected the chairperson of Parliament's portfolio committee on home affairs amid objections against his candidacy over allegations of State Capture involving the Gupta family. Bongo was nominated by the ANC's Musa Chabangu, a nomination which was seconded by another ANC parliamentarian Tidimalo Legwase. Bongo then accepted the nomination and won against the DA's proposed candidate Angel Khanyile. In November 2019, Bongo was arrested in Cape Town on charges of corruption. In 2020, Bongo and 10 other government officials in Mpumalanga were arrested on corruption charges.

Early life
Bongo was born on 29 June 1978 in Dennilton, now in Limpopo's Sekhukhune District Municipality and lying on Mpumalanga's provincial border. He matriculated at Kgothala Secondary School. He is the third of Thomas Bongo and Emily Makhanya's five children and the family in 1999 moved to permanently reside in the township of Siyabuswa, which is located in the Dr JS Moroka Local Municipality (Mpumalanga), while Bongo was studying law at the University of Limpopo.

2017 Zimbabwean coup
On 15 November 2017, Bongo and South African defense minister Nosiviwe Mapisa-Nqakula arrived in Harare as President Jacob Zuma's special envoys to Zimbabwe's 2017 coup that deposed Robert Mugabe

Zuma had dispatched them in his capacity as chairperson of the Southern African Development Community (SADC) to hold talks between Mugabe and generals from the Zimbabwe Defence Force (ZDF) who finally seized power from the late nonagenarian Zanu-PF nationalist leader's almost four-decade rule.

When they arrived at the Harare International Airport they were not allowed to leave the airport until the evening, when they were allowed to move to a hotel. On Thursday, 16 November, Mugabe was at Harare's State House to participate in talks with General Constantino Chiwenga, Bongo and Mapisa-Nqakula over a transition of power.

Later Bongo and  Mapisa-Nqakula met with Angolan president Joao Lourenco, who was chairperson of the SADC's Organ on Politics, Defence and Security, to brief him on the Zimbabwean situation

Bribery and corruption accusations
Bongo was accused of offering a bribe to advocate Ntuthuzelo Vanara, evidence leader of Parliament's inquiry into state capture at Eskom. In an affidavit to speaker Baleka Mbete, Vanara alleged Bongo told him he had been sent by acting Eskom board chairman Zethembe Khoza to offer a bribe – “a blank cheque” – to stop the committee's investigation into Eskom. Mbete referred the matter to the joint committee on ethics.

Bongo was also implicated in a Hawks investigation relating to alleged corrupt land transactions during his time as legal adviser in the Mpumalanga human settlement provincial department, earning a R300 000 deposit for a BMW through a departmental alleged corrupt deal in 2011.

Bongo was fired from Cabinet on 28 February 2018 by incoming president Cyril Ramaphosa.

Parliament's Section 25 committee
Bongo was a group leader of Parliament's ad hoc committee  that was set up in July 2019 to amend Section 25 of the South African Constitution.

Called "Ad Hoc Committee to Initiate and Introduce Legislation Amending Section 25 of the Constitution", the 24-member committee elected Mathole Motshekga as its chair but when hearings were conducted across the country between February and March 2020 the committee was split into two groups to enable it to conduct the hearings countrywide at once, with one group led by Bongo and the other by Motshekga.

It was set up by the National Assembly "to amend section 25 of the Constitution so that expropriation of land without compensation is made explicit, as a legitimate option for land reform ".

The setting up of the review committee followed a report that the opposition Democratic Alliance (DA) described as "complete farce" submitted to Parliament in November 2018  by the Constitutional Review Committee, recommending that section 25 of the Constitution be amended "to make explicit that which is implicit in the Constitution with regards to expropriation of land without compensation as a legitimate option for land reform, so as to address the historic wrongs caused by the arbitrary dispossession of land, and in so doing ensure equitable access to land and further empower the majority of South Africans to be productive participants in ownership, food security and agricultural reform programmes".

The ad hoc committee then began conducting public hearings asking people about the wording that they believed should be put when the piece of law is changed for land expropriation without compensation.

Criminal charges and arrests

On 21 November 2019, Bongo was arrested in Cape Town on corruption charges after being accused of attempts to disrupt a parliamentary graft investigation into Eskom by allegedly offering bribe to evidence leader Ntuthuzelo Vanara. But on 26 February 2021, the Western Cape High Court dismissed the case after it found no evidence of wrong doing against Bongo.

Bongo is currently attending another corruption matter in Mpumalanga court involving a land deal that was allegedly entered into by government during the time when he was legal advisor for a housing provincial department, allegedly getting two luxury vehicles bought by contractors involved in charging government inflated prices. Accomplices Robert Burwise, Patrick Donald Chirwa, Harrington Sizwakhendaba Dhlamini, Blessing Mduduzi Singwane, David Boy Dube, his brother Sipho Joel Bongo, Vusi Willem Magagula, Bongani Louis Henry Sibiya, Elmon Lawrence Mdaka and Sibongile Mercy - were arrested and charged with 69 counts of corruption, fraud, theft, money laundering and contravention of the Public Finance Management Act. All alleged criminal acts were said to have taken place in Mpumalanga province between 2011 and 2012.

References

External links
South African Politicians - Bongani Thomas Bongo
- Bongani Thomas Bongo, Adv
 

1978 births
Living people
South African politicians
African National Congress politicians
Corruption in South Africa
Members of the National Assembly of South Africa